The Return of Iljimae is a 2009 South Korean historical action television series, starring Jung Il-woo in the title role of Iljimae, Yoon Jin-seo, Kim Min-jong and Jung Hye-young. It aired on MBC from January 21 to April 9, 2009 on Wednesdays and Thursdays at 21:55 for 24 episodes.

The series is based on comic strip Iljimae, published between 1975 and 1977, by Ko Woo-young which was based on a Chinese folklore from the Ming dynasty about a masked Robin Hood-esque character during the Joseon era. MBC bought the rights to the comic strip for their adaptation, which was to star Lee Seung-gi in the title role of Iljimae. However he pulled out and was replaced by Jung, which makes him the third Korean actor to play the hero following Jang Dong-gun (MBC, 1993) and Lee Joon-gi for Iljimae (SBS, 2008).

Plot
Iljimae (Jung Il-woo) was born out of wedlock and his father was a high-ranking noble official while his mother was a lowly servant. To protect the honor of his father's family, he was abandoned as a baby and tucked underneath an apricot tree. Thus he was given the name Iljimae ("branch of plum tree").

Iljimae was adopted by a family who lived in the Qing Kingdom. After tracing his roots back to Korea, his father rejects him once more. With a heavy heart, he returns to his native land and unleashes his anger upon the ruling class to fight injustice and tyranny for the sake of the commoners. Wherever he appears to uphold justice, he leaves behind a single branch of a plum tree.

Living an isolated existence and hiding his face behind a mask to be a hero to the people, in Iljimae's life there is one woman who reconnects him to the world: Wol-hee.

Cast and characters

Main cast
Jung Il-woo - Iljimae, a hero who appears when the world needs justice.Although he is a handsome man with delicate features, he also has a strong sense of justice and chivalry. His first love dies tragically and after living an aimless life due to his broken heart, he meets Wol-hee, who is very similar to his first love. He becomes a legendary hero in the kingdom but his destiny is one of loneliness and heartbreak, making him a lonely and melancholy hero.
Cha Jun-hwan - young Iljimae
Yoon Jin-seo - Dal-yi / Wol-heeIljimae loves her for his entire life and she loves him back unconditionally. She is ahead of her times and displays a strong, charismatic personality and a burning defiance against evil people. She takes control of her destiny but in Iljimae's presence, she turns into a shy woman.
Kim Min-jong - Koo Ja-myung, underneath his charismatic demeanor he has a sad past.A sharp thinker, he rises through the ranks in the government as he distinguishes himself as a capable investigator. He falls in love with Baek-mae, Iljimae's mother, at first sight and continues to love her for his entire life. Guilt-ridden for compromising his principles by helping Iljimae escape from prison, he committed suicide.
Jung Hye-young - Baek-mae, Iljimae's motherShe was defiled by her master, a noble, and after giving birth, her baby was taken away from her. Then she was banished from the nobleman's household and for most of her life, she yearns to be reunited with her son Iljimae. She throws away the jewelry that her master gave her to buy her silence and becomes a gisaeng. Though she is from the servant class, she learns how to read and write by watching the privileged children learn the alphabet. She writes poetry. She has inner beauty as well as beautiful looks. Though she sets strict limits on what she will tolerate in a relationship or friendship, she has a warm heart but keeps that side of her under wraps most of the time. She comminted suicide upon hearing that her son had been sentenced to death. Unbeknownst to her, Iljimae has escaped with the help of Ja-myung, but he arrived too late to stop her.

Supporting cast
Kang Nam-gil as Bae Seon-dal
Park Geun-hyung as Kim Ja-jeom
O Yeong-su as Monk Yeol-gong
Lee Kye-in as Jeol Chi
Lee Hyun-woo as Cha-dol
Jeon Soo-yeon as Soo-ryun
Park Chul-min as Wang Hyoeng-bo
Lee Ki-young as Park Bi-soo
Lee Jung-yong as Yang-po
Kim Yoo-hyun as Princess Mo-ran
Moon Heo-won as Shim Chan-kyu
Baek In-cheol as Son Seok-joo
Kwak Min-suk as Kim Ja-jeom's servant
Jeong In-taek as Choi Se-woon
Yeo Min-joo as Choi Kyung-ok
Seo Hye-won as Choon-wol
Jung Dong-hwan as Choe Myeong-gil
Harisu as Ki Seon-nyeo
Park Hyuk-kwon as Lee Myung
Cha Jun-hwan as Young-yi, Iljimae's son
Lee Ga-hyun as Bong-hee
Jeon Hae-ryong

Special appearances
Lee Young-hoo as Princess Mo-ran's father
Chun Ho-jin as Hong Taiji
Maeng Sang-hoon as Iljimae's adoptive father
Lee Ho-jae as Kim Joong-hwan, Iljimae's biological father
Jung Joon as Kim Joon-seo, Iljimae's stepbrother
Kang Shin-il as Kang Se-wook
Jung Sung-il (actor) as Kotaro
Sandara Park as Rie
Park Chan-hwan as Rie's father
Yoon Yoo-sun as Rie's mother
Hwang Jang-lee as Miyamoto Musashi
Lee Do-yeop

Episode ratings

Source: TNS Media Korea

International broadcast
It aired on cable channel KNTV from November 1, 2012 to January 8, 2013.

References

External links
 The Return of Iljimae official MBC website 
 
 

Television series set in the Joseon dynasty
2009 South Korean television series debuts
2009 South Korean television series endings
MBC TV television dramas
South Korean historical television series
South Korean action television series
Korean-language television shows
Television shows based on manhwa
Martial arts television series